Ronald Johan Gottlieb Bandell (24 August 1946 – 16 November 2015) was a Dutch civil servant and politician of the Political Party of Radicals (PPR) and later the Labour Party (PvdA).

Bandell was born in Gouda. He was mayor of Moordrecht (1977-1987), Krimpen aan de Lek (1982-1985, acting), Papendrecht (1987-1995), Alkmaar (1995-2000), and Dordrecht (2000-2010).

In 2014 he became seriously ill and died at the age of 69 in Rotterdam in 2015.
He is survived by his wife, children & spouses, and grandchildren.

References 
  Oud-burgemeester Bandell van Dordrecht overleden, Algemeen Dagblad, 16 November 2015

1946 births
2015 deaths
Dutch civil servants
Labour Party (Netherlands) politicians
Mayors of Alkmaar
Mayors of Dordrecht
Mayors in South Holland
People from Papendrecht
People from Gouda, South Holland
Political Party of Radicals politicians